Rock the Canyon: Art & Music Festival (also Shonto's Rock the Canyon) is an annual art/music festival held in Shonto, Arizona. Established in 2009 by the Shonto Tourism Commission, a subdivision of Shonto Community Governance, to promote Native American artists and musicians, as well as community wellness. The Rock the Canyon festival is currently coordinated by Shonto Economic Development Corporation by its subdivision, Shonto Tourism Committee.

See also
 Monument Valley Film Festival

External links
 
 Rock the Canyon on facebook

Navajo culture
Native American film festivals
Native American history of Arizona
Film festivals in Arizona
Rock festivals in the United States
Heavy metal festivals in the United States
Electronic music festivals in the United States
Folk festivals in the United States
2009 establishments in Arizona
Film festivals established in 2009
History of Navajo County, Arizona